The General Directorate of Civil Status is the agency in charge of civil records in Albania.

References

Government agencies of Albania
Civil Status